The 41st Infantry Brigade Combat Team ("Sunset") is an element in the Oregon Army National Guard. Headquartered at Camp Withycombe, Clackamas, Oregon, it was part of the 7th Infantry Division based at Ft. Carson in Colorado (inactivated in 2006). The brigade traces its lineage back to the 41st Infantry Division.

History
Owing to the deployment of active duty troops to the intensifying Vietnam War, Secretary of Defense Robert McNamara established the Selected Reserve Force, composed of Army National Guard units authorized at a full wartime strength of almost 4,500 men and given increased priority for the receipt of new equipment so that they could be mobilized within a week. In return, such units had an increased number of drilling days. The 41st Infantry Division, split between the Washington and Oregon Army National Guard, was among those selected to contribute units to the force and on 15 November 1965 subordinate units of it were withdrawn from it to form the 41st Infantry Brigade. The brigade included two Washington (the 1st and 2nd Battalions of the 161st Infantry) and one Oregon (the 1st Battalion, 162nd Infantry) infantry battalions. Oregon provided the brigade headquarters at Portland, the brigade armored cavalry reconnaissance troop (Troop E, 82nd Cavalry), the field artillery (2nd Battalion, 218th Artillery), engineers (162nd Engineer Company) and the administration company (Company A, 141st Support Battalion). Washington provided the remainder of the 141st Support Battalion and the brigade aviation company. The remaining units of the 41st Infantry Division contributed men to bring those selected for the brigade up to strength, reducing them from 60% to 50% of authorized TO&E strength. The headquarters of the 1st Brigade of the 41st Infantry Division was reorganized to form the brigade headquarters, leaving it with two brigades.

In 1968, the 41st Infantry Brigade was redesignated as the 41st Separate Infantry Brigade, located primarily within the Oregon Army National Guard. In 1975 the brigade became the "roundout brigade" to the 7th Infantry Division, serving this capacity until August 2006.

In 1994, the 41st Separate Infantry Brigade was designated as "Enhanced" and in 1998 was selected as one of three SIB's assigned to the 7th Infantry Division (Light).

In 1999, 136 members of Company C, 2nd Battalion, 162nd Infantry and Company B, 1st Battalion, 186th Infantry were called up to active duty to protect Patriot missile batteries in Saudi Arabia and Kuwait as part of Operation Southern Watch.

On 11 September 2001, advance elements of the 241st Military Intelligence Company arrived in Tuzla, Bosnia, for a seven-month deployment as part of the NATO Stabilization Force.

1st Battalion, 162nd Infantry was deployed 6 February 2003 in support of Operation Iraqi Freedom, the first unit in 41st Brigade to deploy to combat operations since World War II.

Several months after 1st Battalion, 162nd Infantry deployed to Iraq, 2nd Battalion, 162nd Infantry deployed as part of the 39th Infantry Brigade (Enhanced) (Arkansas National Guard) to Iraq. The battalion served in Baghdad and other parts of Iraq, suffering a number of casualties while conducting stabilization security missions. During the same time, a handful of personnel were sent to train foreign soldiers in Afghanistan.

The 2nd Platoon of Company B, 2nd Battalion, 162nd Infantry was awarded the Presidential Unit Citation for their gallantry in combat, the first award of the Presidential Unit Citation to an Oregon National Guard unit since World War II.

The Presidential Unit Citation reads: "On 3 November 2004, the unit was placed under the operational control of the 1st Regimental Combat Team of the 1st Marine Division, to execute offensive operations in the central Iraqi city of Fallujah.  The unit was selected for the initial attack on the city and tasked with penetrating the enemy's defenses and isolating the Jolan District in northwestern Fallujah.  The Jolan District was believed to be the strongest of the enemy's defenses.  The unit's rapid penetration deep into the city overwhelmed enemy positions, leading the way for further exploitation by the Marines.  Throughout the remainder of the battle, the unit continued to isolate western Fallujah while attacking and destroying numerous enemy strong points.  The unit's heroic Soldiers, and their expert use of combined arms firepower, led to the destruction of the insurgents in Fallujah."

In September, 2005, in the aftermath of Hurricane Katrina, Brigadier General Douglas Pritt commanded the majority of the brigade as part of Task Force Oregon in relief and security efforts near the French Quarter in New Orleans. By the end of the month, when Hurricane Rita wreaked havoc again on the Gulf Coast, the 41st was put in charge of the newly designated Joint Task Force Rita to assist in all disaster-related needs in Texas and Louisiana.

In the spring of 2006, Brig. Gen. Pritt and elements of the brigade joined the personnel already in Afghanistan, making the total force approximately 950 soldiers.  In 2006 the brigade was redesignated to officially become the 41 Infantry Brigade Combat Team.

The 41st Infantry Brigade Combat Team (IBCT) mobilized to Iraq, under the command of Colonel Daniel R. Hokanson, in support of Operation Iraqi Freedom from 2009 to 2010.  The Brigade conducted convoy security for the 13th Expeditionary Sustainment Command and base defense operations across Iraq including Anbar province, Baghdad, and southern Iraq.  It was the largest mobilization of Oregon National Guard troops since the 41st Infantry Division mobilized for World War II.

The 41st IBCT and subordinate units were awarded a Meritorious Unit Commendation for its service in Iraq from 29 July 2009 to 15 April 2010 on 24 September 2013 by GO 2013-77.

In 2014, units of the 41st IBCT, including the 2nd Battalion, 162nd Infantry, 1st Battalion, 186th Infantry, and 1st Squadron, 82nd Cavalry, deployed to Afghanistan in support of Operation Enduring Freedom.

In 2016, the 41st IBCT was reorganized as a part of transformation to add a brigade engineer battalion and a Stryker battalion. With elements located in Washington and New Mexico.

Organization
These are the following units of the 41st Infantry Brigade:

 2nd Battalion, 162nd Infantry Regiment 
Headquarters and Headquarters Company (HHC) Springfield 
Company A, Springfield
Company B, Corvallis
Company C, Gresham
Company D, Hillsboro
G Forward Support Company (G FSC), 141st Brigade Support Battalion (141st BSB), Springfield
 1st Battalion, 186th Infantry Regiment 
Headquarters and Headquarters Company (HHC) Ashland
Company A, Medford
Company B, Klamath Falls
Company C, Roseburg
Detachment 1, Coos Bay
Company D, Grants Pass
H Forward Support Company (H FSC), 141st Brigade Support Battalion (141st BSB), Medford
 1st Battalion, 200th Infantry Regiment (New Mexico Army National Guard) (Las Cruces, New Mexico)
Headquarters and Headquarters Company (HHC) (Las Cruces)
Company A, Rio Rancho
Company B, Rio Rancho
Company C, Las Cruces
Detachment 1, Rio Rancho
Company D, Alamogordo
613th Forward Support Company (613th FSC), Las Cruces
 1st Squadron, 303rd Cavalry Regiment Headquartered in Washington
Headquarters and Headquarters Troop (HHT) Vancouver
Troop A, Puyallup
Troop B, Pasco
Troop C, Centralia
D Forward Support Company (D FSC), 141st Brigade Support Battalion (141st BSB), Centralia
 2nd Battalion, 218th Field Artillery Regiment (2-218th FAR)
Headquarters and Headquarters Battery (HHB) Forest Grove
Battery A, Portland
Battery B, McMinnville
Battery C, Portland
F Forward Support Company (F FSC), 141st Brigade Support Battalion (141st BSB), Forest Grove
741st Brigade Engineer Battalion (741st BEB) 
Headquarters and Headquarters Company (HHC), Clackamas, Oregon
Company A (Engineering), Clackamas
Company B (Engineering), St. Helens
Company C (Signal), Clackamas
Company D (Military Intelligence), Portland
E Forward Support Company (E FSC), 141st Brigade Support Battalion (141st BSB), Clackamas
 141st Brigade Support Battalion (141st BSB) 
Headquarters and Headquarters Company (HHC) Portland
Company A, Portland
Company B (Ordnance), Portland
Company C (Medical), Portland

Commanders

References

Citations

Bibliography 

Global Security.org – 41st Brigade Combat Team
The Institute of heraldry: 41st Brigade Combat Team

Infantry 041
Infantry 041
Infantry 041
Military units and formations in Oregon
Tigard, Oregon
1968 establishments in Oregon
Military units and formations established in 1965